King of Fighters R-1 is a fighting game developed and released by SNK in 1998 for the Neo-Geo Pocket handheld system. It is based on The King of Fighters '97, sharing the same storyline. A sequel, King of Fighters R-2, was released the following year.

Plot

The game shares the same storyline as The King of Fighters '97, taking place after the events of The King of Fighters '96.

Characters
Kyo Kusanagi
Chizuru Kagura
Iori Yagami
Yashiro Nanakase
Shermie
Chris
Terry Bogard
Ryo Sakazaki
Kim Kaphwan
Mai Shiranui
Yuri Sakazaki
Athena Asamiya
Shingo Yabuki
Leona Heidern
Unlockable Characters
Orochi Iori
Orochi Leona
Orochi Yashiro
Orochi Shermie
Orochi Chris
Orochi

1998 video games
2D fighting games
Neo Geo Pocket games
The King of Fighters games
Video games developed in Japan
Video games scored by Takushi Hiyamuta